Ichchhapor is a town in Surat district in the Indian state of Gujarat. The town comes under Hazira Urban Agglomerations.

Demographics
 India census, Ichchhapor had a population of 8291. Males constitute 56% of the population and females 44%. Ichchhapor has an average literacy rate of 79%, higher than the national average of 59.5%: male literacy is 83%, and female literacy is 75%. In Ichchhapor, 13% of the population is under 6 years of age.

References

See also 
List of tourist attractions in Surat

Suburban area of Surat
Cities and towns in Surat district